Croatian referendum may refer to:
 1991 Croatian independence referendum
 2012 Croatian European Union membership referendum
 2013 Croatian constitutional referendum